Sclerorhynchoidei is an extinct suborder of rajiform rays that had long rostra with large denticles similar to sawfishes and sawsharks. This feature was convergently evolved and their closest living relatives are actually skates. While they are often called "sawfishes", sawskates is a more accurate common name for sclerorhynchoids. The suborder contains five named families: Ganopristidae, Ischyrhizidae, Onchopristidae, Ptychotrygonidae, and Schizorhizidae. Several genera (see below) are not currently placed in any of these families. Sclerorhynchoids first appeared in the Barremian and went extinct during the Cretaceous–Paleogene extinction event, with former Paleocene occurrences being misidentifications or reworked specimens.

Phylogeny
Below is a cladogram of Sclerorhynchoidei, with the topology based on Villalobos-Segura et al. (2021b) and the family taxonomy based on Greenfield (2021).

Other genera 
†Agaleorhynchus
†Ankistrorhynchus
†Atlanticopristis
†Australopristis
†Baharipristis
†Biropristis
†Borodinopristis
†Celtipristis
†Columbusia
†Ctenopristis
†Dalpiazia
†Iberotrygon
†Kiestus
†Marckgrafia
†Onchosaurus
†Plicatopristis
†Pucapristis
†Renpetia
†Sao Khua sclerorhynchoid

References

Sclerorhynchoidei